"Before" is a short story by American writer Gael Baudino, written deliberately in a style similar to William Faulkner's: the foreword to the story says, "the sometimes strange syntax and editorial elisions are intentional in this homage to Faulkner."  It concerns Greta Harlow, a young woman living in a Lee's Corners, a small town in fictional Oktibushubee County.  She is raped and impregnated by Jimmy White, son of a prominent and wealthy businessman.  An elderly wealthy woman, Mrs. Gavin, counsels her on how to abort the baby.  The story ends with Greta debating whether to follow through with the abortion or not.  

Lee's Corners, Sophonsiba Gavin, and Greta's child, Magic, all play key parts in Baudino's most recent book, "The Borders of Life" (written as Gael Kathryns).

1996 short stories
American short stories
Fantasy short stories
Rape in fiction